Hexamidine is an antiseptic and disinfectant. Hexomedine is the trade name of a diisethionate solution (1/1.000) of hexamidine. Hexamidine is used primarily as its diisethionate salt, which is more water-soluble than the dihydrochloride. The dihydrochloride was first synthesized and patented as a trypanocide for May & Baker in 1939. Its amoebicidal properties emerged in the 1990s. The exact mechanism of its biocidal action is unknown, but presumed similar to quaternary ammonium compounds, involving binding to the negatively charged lipid membranes of pathogens. Hexamidine and its shorter congener, propamidine, are used as antiseptics and preservatives in pharmaceuticals and cosmetics. They are particularly used for the topical treatment of acanthamoebiasis (Acanthamoeba keratitis).

References 

Antiseptics
Amidines
Phenol ethers